The 1990–91 Louisiana Tech Bulldogs basketball team represented Louisiana Tech University in Ruston, Louisiana as members of the American South Conference during the 1990–91 season. The Bulldogs were led by head coach Jerry Loyd. Louisiana Tech finished third in the American South regular season standings (8–4), but would earn an automatic berth in the NCAA tournament by winning the conference tournament championship.

Roster

Schedule and results

|-
!colspan=9 style=| Regular season

|-
!colspan=9 style=| American South Conference tournament

|-
!colspan=9 style=| NCAA tournament

References

Louisiana Tech Bulldogs basketball seasons
Louisiana Tech
Louisiana Tech
1990 in sports in Louisiana
1991 in sports in Louisiana